Eyesus (Ge'ez: ኢየሱስ ) is an Ethiopian name meaning Joshua. It can also mean Yasu (or Yashu), Yesu, or Jesus.

Various Ethiopian Emperors have used the name including:

Iyasu I of Ethiopia (also known as the Great) (1682 – 1706)
Iyasu II of Ethiopia (1730 – 1755)
Iyasu III of Ethiopia (1784 – 1788)
Iyasu IV of Ethiopia (1830 – 1832)
Lij Iyasu of Ethiopia (1913 – 1916) (uncrowned and excommunicated by the Ethiopian Orthodox Tewahedo Church, not referred to publicly as Iyasu V)

Three claimants to the throne also used Iyasu:
Yeshaq Iyasu claimed the title nəgusä nägäst (1685) of Ethiopia, opponent of Iyasu I
Girma Yohannis Iyasu (1961 – present) - Iyasuist claimant to the abolished throne of Ethiopia
Atse Iyasu - was proclaimed nəgusä nägäst (1787 – 1788) of Ethiopia in Tigray and Gojjam by enemies of Ras Ali I of Yejju